Fritz Fivian (January 15, 1930 – April 2, 2009) was an American wrestler. He competed in the men's Greco-Roman welterweight at the 1960 Summer Olympics.

References

External links
 

1930 births
2009 deaths
American male sport wrestlers
Olympic wrestlers of the United States
Wrestlers at the 1960 Summer Olympics
People from Thun